R518 road may refer to:
 R518 road (Ireland)
 R518 (South Africa)